The 2017–18 Rock Cup was a single-leg knockout tournament played by clubs from Gibraltar. This season's version of the Rock Cup was sponsored by Gibtelecom, and is known as the Gibtelecom Rock Cup for sponsorship purposes. This season's edition was held throughout the season for the first time since 2011–12.

The winner of this competition, Europa, qualified for the 2018–19 Europa League. As they had also qualified for European competition via the 2017–18 Gibraltar Premier Division, the third place team in the league will take the spot in the Europa League.

First round
The First Round draw was held 26 October 2017 and the matches will be played 26–28 November 2017. All teams participating in the first round are from the Gibraltar Second Division. Leo, Hound Dogs and Olympique 13 received byes to the Second Round.

Second round
The draw for the Second Round took place on 13 December 2017, with games to be played 6–27 February 2018. All Gibraltar Premier Division teams enter at this stage, along with the three Gibraltar Second Division teams to receive byes from the first round.

Quarter-finals
The quarter final draw took place on 28 February 2018.

Semi-finals

The draw for the semi-finals took place on 11 April 2018.

Final

Bracket

Top goalscorers
.
6 goals

  Kike Gómez (Europa)
  Rubo Blanco (Mons Calpe)

5 goals
  Pibe (Mons Calpe)
3 goals

  Guillermo Roldán (Europa)
  Ayman Elghobashy (Gibraltar United)

2 goals

  Fernando Cuesta (Bruno's Magpies)
  Javier Rivas (Cannons)
  Diego Godoy (Gibraltar Phoenix)
  Michael Negrette (Gibraltar United)
  John-Paul Duarte (St Joseph's)

1 goal

  José María Martos (Angels)
  Conor Gaul (Bruno's Magpies)
  Reece Price-Placid (Bruno's Magpies)
  Daniel Jimenez Falcon (Cannons)
  Juan Carlos Pineda (Cannons)
  David Cruz (College 1975)
  Enrique Carreño (Europa)
  Martín Belforti (Europa)
  Toni García (Europa)
  José Antonio Campoy (Europa Point)
  Benjamin Edwards-Wilks (Europa Point)
  José Luiz Lopez Blasquez (Europa Point)
  Christian Nuñez (Europa Point)
  Antonio Postigo (Europa Point)
  Tito De Torres (Gibraltar United)
  Marco Mereiles (Gibraltar United)
  Dani Ponce (Gibraltar United)
  Cecil Prescott (Gibraltar United)
  Falu Aranda (Lincoln Red Imps)
  Anthony Bardon (Lincoln Red Imps)
  Antonio Calderón (Lincoln Red Imps)
  Tjay De Barr (Lincoln Red Imps)
  Anthony Hernandez (Lincoln Red Imps)
  Juan Manuel Llaves (Lions Gibraltar)
  Andro Rodriguez (Manchester 62)
  Facundo Cascio (Mons Calpe)
  Kyle Casciaro (FC Olympique 13)
  Scott Ritchie (FC Olympique 13)
  Domingo Ferrer (St Joseph's)
  Wancho Villalba (St Joseph's)

Own goals
 Juan José Pérez (Glacis United) - against Lincoln Red Imps

References

External links
Gibraltar Football Association

Rock Cup
Rock Cup
Rock Cup